The 1994 kidnappings of western tourists in India were the abductions of four foreign tourists in Delhi, India, between 29 September and 20 October 1994, by terrorists. The kidnappings were perpetrated by the anti-Indian terrorist group Harkat-ul-Ansar (HuA), under the pseudonym of Al-Hadid, led by Ahmed Omar Saeed Sheikh to secure the release of HuA leaders. Sheikh was caught and ultimately imprisoned at the Tihar Jail in Delhi. The abductees included three British citizens, Myles Croston, Paul Rideout, and Rhys Partridge, and one American, Béla Nuss; all of them were rescued unharmed by the police.

HuA would also perpetrate the 1995 kidnapping of Western tourists in Kashmir where most of the hostages were killed with one being beheaded. Sheikh was released (along with Harkat leader Masood Azhar and Mushtaq Ahmed Zargar) in 1999 in exchange for hostages of Indian Airlines Flight 814 which had been hijacked by fellow Harkat members. He would go on to kidnap and allegedly murder Daniel Pearl in 2002.

Background
A violent insurgency had been going on in Jammu and Kashmir since 1989. Kidnappings of foreign tourists had been attempted by Kashmiri Militants, most notably the attempt to kidnap seven Israelis in 1991. However, until this point the separatists had not kidnapped anybody outside of the disputed state.

Three of those kidnapped, Paul Benjamin Ridout and Christopher Miles Croston (both kidnapped on 16 October) and Rhys Partridge (Australian citizen of British heritage, kidnapped on 29 September), were from Great Britain and a fourth, Béla Nuss (kidnapped on 19 October), was an American citizen of Hungarian heritage from San Francisco, California; all were kidnapped on gunpoint.

Kidnapping
The tourists were all befriended by young British Ahmed Omar Saeed Sheikh who was a member of Harkat-ul-Ansar and pretending to be an Indian under the name "Rohit Sharma". He told them that his uncle had died and left a village for him. He then invited them to visit the village with him. The three Britons were taken to a village near Saharanpur and kept captive there by his associates. Béla Nuss was the last to be kidnapped and was kept in Ghaziabad just outside Delhi. The kidnappers demanded that the Indian government free ten militants imprisoned in Kashmir and threatened to behead their captives if the demand was not met.

Rescue
Béla Nuss was freed on 31 October by the police, while investigating a robbery, police came across the house where he was being kept captive. After information given to the police by Nuss about other hostages being held, police staked out the house, captured one of the drivers, and the interrogation of two terrorists, later arrested at the site, led them to the village of Saharanpur, where the Britons were being held captive. Omar Saeed was also captured and wounded when he had returned to the Ghaziabad house to talk to Nuss after being informed that he had stopped eating four days before. Two policemen and a militant were killed in a pre-dawn shoot-out at the second location on 1 November. All the tourists were freed unhurt.

Aftermath
Three Pakistani militants belonging to Harkat-ul-Ansar were given death sentences and three others life sentences by a Delhi court in April 2002 for their roles in the kidnapping, while Sheikh's charges had been dropped in exchange for his release. 

Ahmed Omar Saeed Sheikh was incarcerated in Tihar Jail and stayed in prison till December 1999 when he was released in exchange for the passengers aboard hijacked Indian Airlines Flight 814. He subsequently was alleged to be involved in the murder of Daniel Pearl. He was sentenced to death on 14 July 2002 in Pakistan. Under CIA interrogation Khalid Sheikh Mohammad confessed to being the one who personally wielded the blade that killed Daniel Pearl.

In popular culture 
The kidnapping was the subject of a 2008 episode of the television series, Kidnapped Abroad. The Indian film Omerta (2017 film) is based on this kidnapping and Ahmed Omar Saeed Sheikh.

Notes

See also 
 1995 kidnapping of Western tourists in Kashmir

References

External links
 Profile: Omar Saeed Sheikh, BBC, 2002-07-16

1994 crimes in India
Islamic terrorist incidents in 1994
Terrorist incidents in India in 1994
1990s in Delhi
October 1994 crimes
October 1994 events in Asia
Kashmir conflict
Islamic terrorism in India
Crime in Delhi
Rao administration
Kidnappings in India
Hostage taking in India